Raja Bahadur Venkatarama Reddy Telangana State Police Academy (TSPA),  formerly Andhra Pradesh Police Academy, is a government institution in the state of Telangana, India that prepares candidates for service in the police and other law enforcement agencies, forensic scientists, and criminal justice.

It is located in Manchirevula neighbourhood of Hyderabad, India. TSPA works in collaboration with UNODC. It is recognised as "Benchmark" Training Institute.

After the division of Andhra Pradesh state into Telangana and Andhra Pradesh, the academy was listed in Schedule 10 of Andhra Pradesh Reorganisation Act, 2014 and was subsequently renamed as Telangana State Police Academy.

Geography 
Surrounded by hillocks in Himayat sagar, TSPA spreads over 175 acres. It is located about 25 km. from Hyderabad City along the Hyderabad – Chevella road. TSPA is  just 20 km from Rajiv Gandhi International Airport  and  just 14 km from Gachibowli IT zone.

History 
Sri N.T. Rama Rao, the then Chief Minister of Andhra Pradesh, laid the foundation stone for the academy in 1986. Police Officer Sri C. Anjaneya Reddy, IPS was the spirit behind the academy. Sri A.V. Subba Rao, IPS, Sri. H.J. Dora, IPS, Sri M.V. Krishna Rao, IPS, Sri Jaspal Singh, IPS, Sri A.K.Mohanty, IPS, Sri.M. Ratan, IPS, Dr.C.N. Gopin Natha Reddy IPS and Sri N. Sambasiva Rao, IPS contributed to the academy. Dr. M. Malakondaiah, IPS, Addl. DGP became the director on 25 May 2013.

The academy imparted professional training to trainees across India including Andhra Pradesh, Karnataka, Tamil Nadu, Kerala, Tripura, Bihar, Jharkhand and Union Territory of Lakshadweep. The academy trained 4,396 police personnel and prosecuting officers.

Courses

Induction Courses
 Basic Courses
 Pre-Promotion Courses
 Orientation Courses

In-service Courses
 First Course in Investigation.
 Station House Management.
 Essential Law for Police Officers.
 First Course in Forensic Science & Forensic Medicine.

Faculty departments
 Police Science and Misc.
 Intelligence and Security
 Law
 Forensic Science
 Forensic Medicine & Toxicology
 Computers
 Management and Social Sciences
 Administration (Courses for Ministerial Staff)
 Field Training

Recognition
The Academy won recognition from:

 Gary Lewis, Representative of UNODC, ROSA
 Wan Joo Kim, Asst. Attorney General for Civil Rights Division, Dept. of Justice, USA.
 Thomas March Bell, Counsel to the Assistant Attorney General for Human Trafficking.
 Evan Andrew Young, Dept. of Justice, United States.
 Duke Lokka, International Narcotics and Law Enforcement Office, US. Embassy, New Delhi.
 Dr. P.M. Nair, Project Coordinator, Anti Human Trafficking, UNODC.

Museum
Dr Hankins TS Police Museum and Discovery center operates at the facility. It is named after Dr. Hankins, the first Inspector General of police for Nizam State during Nizam V and VI in 1880.

Galleries
 Edged Arms Gallery
 Fire Arms Gallery
 Police Gallery
 Forensic Gallery 
 Communication Gallery

The museum has a Zulfiqar Sword that belonged to Mughal emperor Aurangzeb.

Other facilities
 Library
 Research Center
 International Officers Mess
 Auditorium
 Bank
 Hospital
 Swimming Pool
 Athletic Track
 Stadium
 Post office
 Transport and 
 Welfare Store

See also
 Sardar Vallabhbhai Patel National Police Academy

References 

State agencies of Andhra Pradesh
State agencies of Telangana
Police academies in India
Education in Telangana
1986 establishments in Andhra Pradesh
Educational institutions established in 1986